The 38th Curtis Cup Match was played from June 6 to 8, 2014 at St. Louis Country Club in Ladue, Missouri. The United States won 13 to 7.

Format
The contest was a three-day competition, with three fourball and three foursomes matches on each of the first two days, and eight singles matches on the final day, a total of 20 points.

Each of the 20 matches is worth one point in the larger team competition. If a match is all square after the 18th hole extra holes are not played. Rather, each side earns  a point toward their team total. The team that accumulates at least 10 points wins the competition. In the event of a tie, the current holder retains the Cup.

Teams
Eight players for the USA and Great Britain & Ireland participated in the event plus one non-playing captain for each team.

The American team was selected by the USGA’s International Team Selection Committee.

Six members of the Great Britain & Ireland team were selected automatically, the top four in the World Amateur Golf Ranking (WAGR) as of May 5, 2014 and the leading two players in the LGU’s Order of Merit not selected from the WAGR. The remaining two were picked by the LGU Selection Panel.

Friday's matches

Morning fourballs

Afternoon foursomes

Saturday's matches

Morning fourballs

Afternoon foursomes

Sunday's singles matches

References

External links
Official site 

Curtis Cup
Golf in Missouri
Curtis Cup
Curtis Cup
Curtis Cup
Curtis Cup